Nikhil Sarkar (1 May 1932 – 17 August 2004) popularly known as Sripantha was a Bengali social historian, writer and journalist.
{{Infobox person
| name               = Sripantha
| native_name        = শ্রীপান্থ
| honorific suffix   = 
| image              = 
| alt                = 
| caption            = 
| birth_name         = Nikhil Sarkar
| birth_date         = 1 May 1932
| birth_place        = Gouripur, Mymensingh District, Bengal Presidency, British India (Now in Bangladesh
| death_date         = 17 August 2004
(aged 72)
| death_place        = Calcutta, West Bengal, India
| other_names        = Sripantha (শ্রীপান্থ)
| alma_mater         = University of Calcutta
| nationality        = Indian
| occupation         = Journalist, author, historian
| organization       = Jugantar Patrika, Ananda Bazar Patrika
| years_active       = 
| known_for          = Kolkata Karchra (Notebooks of Kolkata)
| notable_works      = Ajob Nagori,
Sripanther Kolkata, Elokeshi Mohanta Sammand'
| awards             = Ananda Puraskar (1978)
}}

Early life
Sarkar was born at Gouripur village of Mymensingh district in 1932 in British India. After competed primary education in Mymensingh, he graduated in history from the University of Calcutta.

literary career
He started his journalist career with Bengali daily Jugantar and thereafter joined in Anandabazar Patrika in the 1960s. Sarkar became associate editor of Anandabazar Patrika. He was in charge of the editorial page and Monday column named Kalkatar Karcha (Notebook of Kolkata). His numerous books were published under the pseudonym Sripantha. Sarkar worked on sub-altern history of Kolkata as well as Bengali culture. He was awarded the Ananda Puraskar in 1978.

List of major works
 Ajob Nagari Sripanther Kolkata Jokhon Chapakhana Elo Mohanto Elokeshi Sambad Keyabat Meye Thagi Metiyaburujer Nabab Dai Bat Tala Harem and Debdashi Kolkata''

References

1932 births
2004 deaths
Indian male journalists
Bengali-language writers
Indian columnists
Bengali historians
Indian newspaper editors
Writers from Kolkata
Recipients of the Ananda Purashkar
20th-century Indian journalists
People from Mymensingh District
University of Calcutta alumni